James Wilkes (born 1958) is an American former basketball player.

James Wilkes may also refer to

Jimmy Wilkes (1925–2008), American baseball player
Jim Wilkes (born 1950), American lawyer

See also
James Wilks (born 1978), English mixed martial arts fighter
Jim Wilks (born 1958), American football player